Yeshiva.co is an English website affiliated with Beit El Yeshiva.

History
The site offers Torah lessons for reading, viewing and listening. It was founded by Ezra Cohen and partners in Adar 5760 (2000), with the encouragement and support of the Rosh Yeshiva, Rabbi Zalman Baruch Melamed.

Yeshiva.co is the second established Yeshiva site after the site of Yeshivat Har Etzion and is the first Jewish site available on cell phones. The purpose of the site is to serve the public, and open a gate to the world of the Torah for every Jew in Israel and abroad. Today it has 16 employees maintaining the site.

The site used to be an English division of Yeshiva.org.il but since the beginning of 2013  has its own domain.
The site also occasionally organizes conferences on various subjects, such as conferences for Rabbis answering questions on "Ask the rabbi" or conferences open to the public.

Structure 

 Torah classes given by Rabbis, mostly identified with the Religious Zionism. Some lessons are in audio, some in video, some in text and some with all three types. The lessons are divided by a very extensive and detailed index. Among the topics: Gemara, Halacha (Jewish laws), faith, Tanach (Bible), Torah portion, Holidays and more.
 Internet TV channel which broadcasts Torah lessons throughout the day. On special occasions it broadcasts conferences and seminars or Q & A sessions with Rabbis. The channel's peak was broadcasting the funeral of Rabbi Mordechai Eliyahu Zt"l. This broadcast was also available for the first time on mobile devices.
 A library with a large number of books that can be read on - line or downloaded.
 A database of thousands of questions, answered by different Religious Zionist Rabbis. The new questions are posted on the home page of the site. Close to Jewish holidays a link is attached to questions relevant to that date. Israeli news websites sometimes look for different Q & A to add to an article.
 Calendar and system for calculating all time that have a religious significance. This was done with a much research and computerized effort. Visitors can check different Jewish times and also sign up for an e-mail or SMS of desired times.
 An embedding system, which allows other websites to add a Jewish calendar, daily Q & A or daily lesson to their site

References

External links 
Yeshiva.co Official Website

Torah
Judaism websites
Orthodox Jewish outreach
Orthodox Judaism in Israel
Religious Zionist organizations
Religious Zionist yeshivot